Nate Johnson may refer to:

 Nate Johnson (basketball) (born 1977), American basketball player
 Nate Johnson (meteorologist), American meteorologist
 Nate Johnson (baseball), American Negro league pitcher
 Nate Johnson (tackle) (1920–2004), American football tackle
 Nate Johnson (wide receiver) (born 1957), American football wide receiver

See also
 Nathan Johnson (disambiguation)
 Nathaniel Johnson (disambiguation)